Duff Morrison Bruce MM (27 August 1898 – 1972) was a Scottish professional footballer who played in the Scottish League for Aberdeen and Brechin City as a left back.

Personal life 
Bruce was born in Aberdeen and moved to New Cross in 1910. He served in the Royal Horse Artillery during the First World War and saw action at the Somme, Arras, Vimy Ridge and Messines on the Western Front. His unit subsequently moved to the Italian front and he spent two months out of the frontline with scabies in early 1918. Despite a poor disciplinary record, which saw him demoted from lance bombardier to gunner, Bruce won the Military Medal during the course of his service. His career was effectively ended in 1928 when he lost an eye during a brawl at a coffee stall in Aberdeen. After his retirement from football, Bruce lived with his wife in Milltimber and worked as an engineer.

Career statistics

Honours 
Aberdeen

 Dewar Shield: 1926

References

Aberdeen F.C. players
Scottish footballers
Association football fullbacks
1898 births
1972 deaths
Footballers from Aberdeen
Charlton Athletic F.C. players
Brechin City F.C. players
Forres Mechanics F.C. players
Scottish Football League players
Recipients of the Military Medal
British Army personnel of World War I
Royal Horse Artillery soldiers
Scottish amputees
Association footballers with limb difference
Scottish disabled sportspeople
Scottish engineers
Military personnel from Aberdeen